"Always Late (with Your Kisses)" is a song co-written and recorded by American country music artist Lefty Frizzell. It was the fifth single released from his 1951/1952 album Listen to Lefty. It peaked at number one in 1951 and became his fourth release to hit the top.

Recording and composition
During early 1951, Lefty Frizzell was enjoying the success followed by his hit debut, "If You've Got the Money (I've Got the Time)". By this time, Frizzell and Hank Williams were the biggest names in country music. Frizzell met for another session on May 24, which capped off a single. "Always Late (With Your Kisses)" with the B-side "Mom and Dad's Waltz" was released in July and in August the single rose to the number one slot on the US Country chart.

"Mom and Dad's Waltz" peaked at number two for eight weeks on the country chart. The song has been covered by many different artists, most credibly, long-time Lefty Frizzell friend, George Jones, who was influenced by Frizzell. He covered the song in 1973 on his album, Nothing Ever Hurt Me (Half As Bad as Losing You).

Chart performance

Cover version
In addition to Frizzell's own stereo re-recording of "Always Late" in 1959, many artists have recorded cover versions of the song, including:

George Jones version
George Jones covered the song for his 1973 album: Nothing Ever Hurt Me

Jo-El Sonnier version
Jo-El Sonnier covered the song in 1976. His version reached No. 99 on the U.S. country chart.

Merle Haggard version
Merle Haggard covered the song in 2001 on his album Roots, Volume 1.

Leona Williams version
A version by Leona Williams charted in 1981, reaching No. 84 on the same chart.

Dwight Yoakam version

"Always Late with Your Kisses" was covered by country music artist Dwight Yoakam. It is the fourth and final single released from his 1987 album Hillbilly Deluxe. It peaked at No. 9 in the United States, and No. 5 in Canada.

Chart performance

Music video
The music video was directed by Sherman Halsey.

References

Songs about kissing
1951 singles
1988 singles
Lefty Frizzell songs
George Jones songs
Jo-El Sonnier songs
Dwight Yoakam songs
Merle Haggard songs
Songs written by Lefty Frizzell
1951 songs
Columbia Records singles
Reprise Records singles
Music videos directed by Sherman Halsey
Song recordings produced by Pete Anderson
Song recordings produced by Don Law